Bis(hydroxymethyl)urea is an organic compound with the formula OC(NHCH2OH)2.  This white water-soluble solid is an intermediate in the formation of urea-formaldehyde resins.  It forms upon treatment of urea with an excess of formaldehyde.

References

Ureas